The 2017 Towson Tigers football team represented Towson University in the 2017 NCAA Division I FCS football season. They were led by ninth-year head coach Rob Ambrose and played their home games at Johnny Unitas Stadium. They were a member of the Colonial Athletic Association. They finished the season 5–6, 3–5 in CAA play to finish in a three-way tie for seventh place.

Schedule

Game summaries

Morgan State

at Maryland

at Saint Francis (PA)

at Stony Brook

No. 14 Villanova

No. 13 Richmond

at No. 18 New Hampshire

No. 23 Delaware

at No. 7 Elon

at William & Mary

Rhode Island

References

Towson
Towson Tigers football seasons
Towson Tigers football